Rogelio "Roger" Jimenez Espina (born June 30, 1960) is a Filipino politician from Biliran, Philippines. He was the governor of Biliran from 2019 to 2022, and previously from 2001 to 2010. He also served as representative for the lone district of Biliran from 2010 to 2019.

Early life
Espina was born in Manila, Philippines. From 1976 to 1980, he studied at the Far Eastern University with a bachelor's degree on zoology. From 1980 to 1984 at the same school, he studied a degree on Doctor of Medicine. He was a medical specialist in the Philippine Department of Health (Valenzuela District) from January 1, 1997 to April 1, 1998.

References

External links

Province of Biliran Official Website

|-

|-

|-

|-

|-

Living people
Governors of Biliran
1960 births
Nacionalista Party politicians
Far Eastern University alumni
San Sebastian College – Recoletos alumni
Members of the House of Representatives of the Philippines from Biliran